Kurt Ivar Björn Johansson  (25 February 1914 – 8 August 2011) was a Swedish shooter who competed at the 1948, 1960 and 1968 Olympics. In 1948 in London he placed fourth in the free rifle, three positions, 300 m event. In 1960 he finished 19th in the same event and 15th in the 50 m rifle prone competition. In 1968 he placed 17th, 20th and 26th in the mixed free rifle, three positions, 300 m, mixed small-bore rifle, three positions, 50 m, and mixed small-bore rifle, prone, 50 m, respectively.

Johansson was born in Stockholm and competed out of Södermalm Liljeholmens Skf. He was a successful international competitor outside of the Olympic Games and gained a reputation at the 1947 ISSF World Shooting Championships in his native Stockholm. There he captured individual silver in the 300 m prone and kneeling positions, gold in the 300 m standard position, and bronze in the 50 m prone position, as well as team gold in the 300 m standard position and bronze in the 300 m rifle three position competition. Prior to World War II he had won bronze in the 50 m rifle three positions tournament at the 1939 World Championships. At the 1949 edition he won individual silver in the 300 m prone position in addition to team gold in the 300 m standard rifle, silver in the 50 m rifle three positions tournament, and bronze in the 300 m rifle three position event. In 1952 he earned team silver medals in the 300 m standard and three position competitions, as well as the 50 three position event. He captured only two medals, an individual silver in the 50+100 m prone and a team bronze in the 300 m three positions tournament, in 1954, prior to breaking from the international scene.

Following his experiences at the 1960 Summer Olympics, Johansson captured individual bronze in the 300 m rifle prone and team gold in the 50 m rifle prone competitions at the 1962 ISSF World Shooting Championships. In 1966 he took his final individual gold medals — gold in the 300 m rifle prone and bronze in the 300 m rifle kneeling — and was awarded the Svenska Dagbladet Gold Medal for his sporting achievements that year, most notably being the oldest-ever ISSF World Championship gold medalist at the time.  He died on 8 August 2011, at the age of 97, in Strängnäs, Sweden.

References 

1914 births
2011 deaths
Olympic shooters of Sweden
Shooters at the 1948 Summer Olympics
Shooters at the 1960 Summer Olympics
Shooters at the 1968 Summer Olympics
Swedish male sport shooters
Sportspeople from Stockholm
20th-century Swedish people
21st-century Swedish people